The Moltke I cabinet was the government of Denmark from 22 March 1848 to 15 November 1848. It was also referred to as the March Cabinet.

In March 1848, Copenhagen was full of rumours that Schleswig and Holstein had rebelled against Denmark, and the National Liberals took advantage of the situation by arranging protest demonstrations against King Frederick VII and his politics. On 21 March, King Frederick responded by dismissing his ministers and asking Carl Emil Bardenfleth to form a new government. Bardenfleth failed to reach a compromise with the National Liberals, however, and so did Peter Georg Bang whom the king had asked to take his place. On the morning of 22 March the king begged Adam Wilhelm Moltke, the leader of the previous cabinet, to lead a government of responsible ministers, effectively ending the absolute monarchy. Moltke quickly managed to put a government together, the Cabinet of Moltke I.

It was replaced by the Cabinet of Moltke II on 15 November 1848.

List of ministers and portfolios
Some of the terms in the table end after 15 November 1848 because the minister was in the Cabinet of Moltke II as well.

See also
Revolutions of 1848
Schleswig-Holstein question

References

General:

In-line:

1848 establishments in Denmark
Cabinets disestablished in 1848
Moltke 1